Mihkel Kraav (born 9 February 1966 in Tartu) is an Estonian historian, data communications specialist and politician. He was a member of VII Riigikogu.

References

Living people
1966 births
20th-century Estonian historians
Members of the Riigikogu, 1992–1995
University of Tartu alumni
Academic staff of the University of Tartu
Politicians from Tartu
Writers from Tartu
21st-century Estonian historians